Traditional Persian residential architecture is the architecture employed by builders and craftsmen in the cultural Greater Iran and the surrounding regions to construct vernacular houses. The art  draws from various cultures and elements from both Islamic and pre-Islamic times.

Birthday parties
Being farmers mean great calls.
have hot summers, and cold, dry winters. Iran’s traditional architecture is designed in proportion to its climatic conditions. The continued design and existence of traditional homes amidst the preponderance of mid-rise apartments in Iran's ongoing modernisation projects is testament to a strong connection and identification with Persian architectural heritage.
  
Iran's old city fabric is composed of narrow winding streets called koocheh with high walls of adobe and brick, often roofed at various intervals. This form of urban design, which used to be commonplace in Iran, is an optimal form of desert architecture that minimizes desert expansion and the effects of dust storms. It also maximizes daytime shades, and insulates the “fabric” from severe winter temperatures.

Islamic beliefs coupled with the necessity to defend cities against frequent foreign invasions encouraged traditional Persian residential architects to create inward seeking designs amidst these narrow complicated koochehs, weaving tightly knit residential neighborhoods. Thus, the house becomes the container as opposed to the contained. These houses possess an innate system of protection: they all have enclosed gardens with maximum privacy, preventing any view into the house from the outside world. Hence residential architecture in Persia was designed in a way to provide maximum protection to the inhabitants during times of tension and danger, while furnishing a microcosm of tranquillity that protected this inner "paradise garden".

Neighborhoods in old Persian cities often formed around shrines of popular saints. All public facilities such as baths, houses of mourning (tekyehs), teahouses, administration offices, and schools were to be found within the neighborhood itself. In addition to the main bazaar of the city, each neighborhood often had its own bazaar-cheh as well (i.e. “little bazaar”), as well as its own ab anbar (or public water reservoir), which provided the neighborhood with clean water. Qazvin, for example had over 100 such reservoirs before being modernized with city plumbing in modern times.

When visiting Kashan in 1993, the chairman of UNESCO remarked: “Kashani architects are the greatest alchemists of history. They could make gold out of dust”. Indeed, almost all of Kashan's masterpieces, as in many other parts of Iran are made of humble, local, earth.

Like many other cities throughout Iran, stucco was the most widespread method of ornamentation in Persian houses. One reason was the relatively cheap price of the materials used (like gypsum for example) that don't require a high temperature to be transformed into plaster. This is an important consideration in places like central Iran where wood is relatively scarce. Another reason is that it is easily shaped, molded, or carved. Thanks to stucco, a wall of crudely fashioned stone blocks or raw brick, gives an impression of great luxury. Thus stucco owes its luxurious appearance to the skill of the craftsman. And with a tradition of stucco technique going back to pre-Islamic Iran, this is an art fully mastered by Persian craftsmen, as seen here.

Earthquakes in Iran leave massive destruction. Most of Iran's remaining traditional houses date from the post-quake eras during the Qajar period. Despite the efforts of architects to build resistance to earthquakes into their works, hardly anything remains from the spectacular Safavi palaces or anything prior to those as recounted by French and British explorers in many parts of Persia.

Characteristics of traditional Persian residential architecture
Almost all traditional Persian houses were designed in order to satisfy the following essential features:

 Hashti and Dalan-e-vorudi: Entering the doorway one steps into a small enclosed transitional space called Hashti. Here one is forced to redirect one's steps away from the street and into the hallway, called Dalan e Vorudi. In mosques, the Hashti enables the architect to turn the steps of the believer to the correct orientation for prayer hence giving the opportunity to purify oneself before entering the mosque.
 Convenient access to all parts of the house.
 A central pool (howz) with surrounding gardens containing trees of figs, pomegranates, and grape vines. 
 Important partitionings such as the biruni (exterior) and the andaruni (interior). 
 Specific orientation facing toward and away from Mecca.

Furthermore, Persian houses in central Iran were designed to make use of an ingenious systems of wind catchers that create unusually cool temperatures in the lower levels of the building. Thick massive walls were designed to keep the sun's heat out in the summertime while retaining the internal heat in the winters.

Persia's distinctive artistic heritage with efficient yet ancient technical know-how thus created houses and spaces whose features were aesthetic talars and roofscapes with intriguing light wells, as well as intricate window and mirror works, paintings, reliefs, and a beautifully crafted iwan amidst comfortable residential spaces in hot arid regions.

Whereas the geometrical rigor seen in the works such as those in Safavi era Isfahan invoke the perfect order of the celestial world, the vegetal ornamentation realized in the interiors of houses, testify to the Persian love of gardens. And the stucco carvings, frescoes, and paintings executed by royal craftsmen, exemplify the level of Persian aesthetics.

Elements 	

Talar
Iwan
Dalan-e vorudi
Badgir
Qanat
Kariz
Gonbad
Garden (hayāt)
Shabestan
Kucheh
Panjdari
Hashti
Andaruni
Biruni
Ab anbar
Yakhchal
Howz

Samples
Abbasian House
House of Tabatabaei
Amerian House
Borujerdi ha House
House of Qavam
Tiznoo House

Notes

Architecture in Iran
Persian gardens

Islamic architecture